Monte Fasce is a mountain in Liguria, northern Italy, part of the Ligurian Apennines.  It is located in the province of Genoa. It lies at an altitude of 834 metres.

Nature conservation 

The mountain and its surrounding area are included in a SIC (Site of Community Importance) called Monte Fasce (code:IT1331718).

References

Mountains of Liguria
Natura 2000 in Italy
Mountains under 1000 metres
Mountains of the Apennines
Mountains of Italy under 1000 metres